Aydın Büyükşehir Belediyespor 2020-21 season is the sixth year of the club's third season in the Turkish Women's Volleyball League. 
Aydın Büyükşehir Belediyespor started the season with 3 foreign players.

The club competes in:
Turkish Women's Volleyball League
Turkish Women's Volleyball Cup

Team Roster Season 2020-21

Squad changes for the 2020–2021 season

In:

Out:

Results, schedules and standings

Regular Season First Half

|}

Regular Season Second Half

|}

External links

References 

Aydın Büyükşehir Belediyespor seasons